The Lachnospiraceae are a family of obligately anaerobic, variably spore-forming bacteria in the order Eubacteriales that ferment diverse plant polysaccharides to short-chain fatty acids (butyrate, acetate) and alcohols (ethanol). These bacteria are among the most abundant taxa in the rumen and the human gut microbiota. Members of this family may protect against colon cancer in humans by producing butyric acid. Lachnospiraceae have been found to contribute to diabetes in genetically susceptible (ob/ob) germ-free mice.

References

Further reading 

 
 
 
 
 
 

 
Bacteria families